The 2022–23 Southern Jaguars basketball team represented Southern University in the 2022–23 NCAA Division I men's basketball season. The Jaguars, led by fifth-year head coach Sean Woods, played their home games at the F. G. Clark Center in Baton Rouge, Louisiana as members of the Southwestern Athletic Conference.

Previous season
The Jaguars finished the 2021–22 season 17–14, 12–6 in SWAC play to finish third place. As the No. 3 seed, they lost to No. 6 seed Grambling State.  They did not receive a bid to any post season tournaments, ending their season with a 17–14 record.

Roster

Schedule and results

|-
!colspan=12 style=| Exhibition

|-
!colspan=12 style=| Non-conference regular season

|-
!colspan=9 style=| SWAC regular season

|-
!colspan=9 style=| SWAC tournament

|-

Source

References

Southern Jaguars basketball seasons
Southern Jaguars
Southern Jaguars basketball
Southern Jaguars basketball